Oli Pettigrew (born 2 April 1981) is a television presenter and former model.

Early Life 

Pettigrew was born in Hong Kong and moved to England when he was five years old. He has an older brother Simon, lead singer for the band Ghosts, and younger brother Chris. He has an older sister from his father's first marriage named Natasha. Oli's paternal uncle is Lt. Colonel (ret.) Paul Pettigrew, (6GRRA). 

Oli was schooled in England, attended Cranmore as a youth and prestigious boarding school, Cranleigh. As a youth, Oli dreamed of becoming an RAF pilot, but while traveling to Hong Kong for a gap year, a chance introduction to the modeling agency Signal 8 in Hong Kong changed his life path dramatically.

Upon signing, Oli worked a number of smaller modeling jobs for various magazines and department stores before landing a campaign for Levi's. His adventures led him to accept a role in Gen-Y Cops, the sequel to Jackie Chan's 1999 film Gen-X Cops. After his gap year was over, Pettigrew returned to England to finish his studies at Southhampton Institute.

Education 
Pettigrew was educated at Cranleigh School, an English boarding school in Surrey. He attended Southampton Institute and graduated in 2004. Shortly after, he moved to SE Asia, where he began his career in the entertainment industry.

Career 

While on a gap year before attending university, Pettigrew began his career as a model in Hong Kong in 1999 with a number of smaller jobs, which culminated in a campaign for Levi's and a speaking role in the 2000 film GenY- Cops starring Edison Chen, Maggie Q, and Paul Rudd in his Asian cinema debut. Most of Pettigrew's performance was whittled down to a few scenes, but that didn't dampen his growing fascination with media and entertainment.

A move to Singapore in 2004 found Pettigrew signed with Singapore based agency Phantom Model Management, which is where he met his future wife. Not long after the pair started dating, Pettigrew found more opportunities in television. His first show, Eco 4 the World, was his first introduction to the television environment. His quick wit and insightful commentary helped him gain traction and more demand, and he shifted his focus from model to program host. This success was quickly followed by introductions to CEOs and producers at Animax and AXN, which culminated in a successful rise to fame as one of their anchor hosts, helming the prime-time show Sony Style TV Magazine for AXN in 2007 (a role that earned him a nomination for Best TV Host at the Elle Singapore Awards 2008), many features, guest spots, as well as hosting Cash Cab Asia, for which he would end up winning the Asian Television Award for Best Entertainment Host in 2012.

Pettigrew proved his versatility by hosting numerous shows with various subject matters for Lonely Planet, Channel News Asia, Channel V, Star World, HBO Asia, Cinemax Asia, Food Network Asia, TLC and AXN. A program called Kids Vs Film (co-hosted with Mohini Sule, filmed in 2013) earned him a nomination for Asian Rainbow TV Awards - Best Program Host, which he also won. His work for a series of vignettes on Food Network Asia, particularly his reviews for Korean street food, caught the attention of executives at Scripps Network in New York, and Pettigrew was invited to Los Angeles for introductions. After securing an agent, Pettigrew returned to Singapore to explore his options.

In early 2014, Pettigrew and his family moved to the United States and landed in Texas where his wife's family is based. Not long after buying a home to establish roots, he was hired to co-host Right This Minute, a television show filmed in Arizona, joining co-hosts Beth Troutman, Nick Calderon, Gayle Bass, and Christian Vera. (Charity Bailey would join the team a couple of years later.) For two years he shuttled back and forth between the two states until finally settling the family in Arizona.

Personal Life 
After eight years of hosting Right This Minute, the show finally ended production in the late spring of 2022 and the Pettigrew family returned to their homestead in Texas, where Pettigrew bases his burgeoning media presence out of a home studio about his wry observations of the local flora, fauna and entertainment scene. 

Pettigrew created the media personality That Englishman In Texas to explore his growing fascination with his new home in the Lone Star State, and to highlight his adventures and musings along the way.

Other Ventures 
Oli is a co-founder and supporter of the fitness brand Ritual Gym with his hetero-lifemate Brad Robinson, CEO and former MMA fighter and commentator, and Ian Tan.

Oli is currently assembling a production house tentatively titled That Englishman Productions.

In 2008, Oli and his wife, along with fellow television host Mohini Sule, began a co-op called [the]Collective-Asia, a representative network of fellow international television personalities and hosts (consisting of Rovilson Fernandez, Marc Nelson, Simon Yin, Justin Bratton, Alan Wong, Angelique Teo, Erin Lim, and Jason Godfrey) based in Singapore.

Television

Awards

References 

Living people
Hong Kong male models
Hong Kong television presenters
1981 births